Soerensen may refer to:

Jan Soerensen or Jan Sørensen, (born 1955), Danish former football player
Nicki Soerensen or Nicki Sørensen, (born 1975), Danish professional road bicycle racer
Palle Soerensen or Palle Sørensen, (born 1927), former small-time criminal who shot and killed four police officers in 1965
Peder Soerensen, known as Petrus Severinus (1542–1602), Danish physician and follower of Paracelsus
Rolf Soerensen or Rolf Sørensen, (born 1965), Danish former professional road bicycle racer
Soeren Peter Lauritz Soerensen (1868–1939), Danish chemist, created the pH scale for measuring acidity and alkalinity

See also
Sorensen
Sorenson (disambiguation)
Sørensen